Japanese the Manga Way: An Illustrated Guide to Grammar & Structure (with the alternative Japanese title of  Manga de Manabu Nihongo Bunpō) is an educational book by Wayne P. Lammers published by Stone Bridge Press designed to teach Japanese through the use of manga. The use of a pop-culture teaching aid in the form of manga represents a growing trend of Japanese-as-a-second-language students learning for fun, instead of for business reasons.

Its origins began with the canceled journal Mangajin, where Lammers worked as a checker for Vaughan P. Simmons's Mangajin drafts. Following the end of the Mangajin publications, deals with manga publishers had been negotiated, and Lammers had obtained the rights to use the translation notes, comic panels found in Mangajin for the new book. The new book also inherited the 4-line translation format from Mangajin.

Manga used
OL Shinkaron
Okusama Shinkaron
Zesetsu Gendai Yōgo Binran
Bar Lemon Heart
Kachō Shima Kōsaku
Buchō Shima Kōsaku
Kaji Ryūsake no Gi
Obatarian
Bonobono
Ojama Shimasu
Ishii Hisaichi Senshū
What's Michael?
Dai-Tokyo Binbo Seikatsu Manual
Nat-chan wa ne!?
Ai ga Hoshii
Kaishain no Melody
Shoot!
Natsuko no Sake
Natsu no Kura
Take'emon-ke no Hitobito
Sr. Garcia
Don't Cry, Tanaka-kun
Ashita mo genki!
Maboroshi no Futsū Shōjo
Furiten-kun
Kariage-kun
Crayon Shin-chan

See also
Japanese in Mangaland
Mangajin

References

External links
Stone Bridge Press page

Japanese language learning resources
Books about manga
Stone Bridge Press books
2004 non-fiction books